K13 or K-13 may refer to:
 K-13 (film), a 2019 Indian Tamil psychological mystery thriller
 K-13 (Kansas highway)
 K-13 (missile), a Soviet air-to-air missile
 K13 gas fields, in the North Sea
 , a submarine of the Royal Navy
 Keratin 13
 Nissan Micra (K13), a Japanese subcompact car
 Sonata in F, K. 13, by Wolfgang Amadeus Mozart
 Suwon Air Base, established during the Korean War
 K-13, a fictional ski run in the South Park episode "Asspen"